Russ Reynolds Field, located in Flint, Michigan, has been home to the Beecher High School Buccaneers for many years. In 2002, it also became the home of the Michigan Admirals of the North American Football League. In 2005, the Admirals became the NAFL 2 Northern Conference Champions. The Admirals moved to Flint's Atwood Stadium prior to folding. The stadium is named after Russ Reynolds, a legendary football player from the 1920s, who played at nearby Flint Northern. The stadium capacity is 1,500.

High school football venues in the United States